Nationality words link to articles with information on the nation's poetry or literature (for instance, Irish or France).

Events
 Elizabeth I ascends the throne of England

Works published
 Joachim du Bellay, France:
 Des Antiquités de Rome ("Antiquities of Rome")
 Les Regrets, melancholy satire, a sonnet sequence, including "Heureux qui comme Ulysse"
 Divers Jeux Rustiques
 Poésies latines
 Friedrich Dedekind, Grobianus et Grobiana: sive, de morum simplicitate, libri tres, a poem written by a German in Latin elegiac verse; enormously popular across Continental Europe (an enlarged version of Grobiana of 1554, which was in turn an enlarged version of Grobianus 1549)
 Giovanni Della Casa; Italy:
 Lyric Poems
 Galateo
 Abdurrahman Mushfiqi, Diviani Mataibat, satires, Persian

Births
Death years link to the corresponding "[year] in poetry" article:
 October 24 – Szymon Szymonowic born (died 1629), Polish humanist, poet and playwright, called "the Polish Pindar"
Also:
 Abraham Fraunce, born this year or 1560, (died 1593), English poet
 Robert Greene (died 1592), English author best known today for his pamphlet containing a polemic attack on William Shakespeare
 Thomas Kyd (died 1594), English dramatist and poet
 Thomas Lodge (died 1625), English dramatist and writer of the Elizabethan and Jacobean periods
 Chidiock Tichborne (died 1586), English conspirator and poet
 William Warner (died 1609), English poet
 Dinko Zlatarić (died 1613), Croatian poet and translator

Deaths
Birth years link to the corresponding "[year] in poetry" article:
 Mellin de Saint-Gelais (born 1491),  French poet of the Renaissance and Poet Laureate of Francis I of France
 Francisco Sa de Miranda (born 1495), Portuguese
 Cassandra Fedele, (born 1465), Italian, Latin-language poet

See also

 Poetry
 16th century in poetry
 16th century in literature
 Dutch Renaissance and Golden Age literature
 Elizabethan literature
 French Renaissance literature
 Renaissance literature
 Spanish Renaissance literature

Notes

16th-century poetry
Poetry